The men's shot put event at the 1988 Summer Olympics in Seoul, South Korea had an entry list of 21 competitors from 17 nations, with two qualifying groups before the final (12) took place on Friday September 23, 1988. The maximum number of athletes per nation had been set at 3 since the 1930 Olympic Congress. The event was won by Ulf Timmermann of East Germany, the nation's second victory in the men's shot put. Randy Barnes of the United States took silver, the second straight Games that an American finished second. Werner Günthör earned Switzerland's first medal in the event, a bronze.

Background

This was the 21st appearance of the event, which is one of 12 athletics events to have been held at every Summer Olympics. The returning finalists from the 1984 Games were defending champion Alessandro Andrei of Italy, fifth-place finisher Werner Günthör of Switzerland, and tenth-place finisher Gert Weil of Chile. Günthör had won the 1987 world championship and 1986 European championship. Andrei had held the world record until May of 1988, when Ulf Timmermann of East Germany had made the first throw over 23 metres. Timmermann and his countryman Udo Beyer (1976 gold medalist and 1980 bronze medalist) were expected to challenge Günthör for gold, along with Randy Barnes of the United States.

The People's Republic of China made its debut in the men's shot put. The United States made its 20th appearance, most of any nation, having missed only the boycotted 1980 Games.

Competition format

The competition used the two-round format introduced in 1936, with the qualifying round completely separate from the divided final. In qualifying, each athlete received three attempts; those recording a mark of at least 20.20 metres advanced to the final. If fewer than 12 athletes achieved that distance, the top 12 would advance. The results of the qualifying round were then ignored. Finalists received three throws each, with the top eight competitors receiving an additional three attempts. The best distance among those six throws counted.

Records

The standing world and Olympic records prior to the 1988 Games were as follows.

Twelve throws by four men beat the old record. Werner Günthör had the first, with his initial throw in the final round of 21.45 metres. Ulf Timmermann quickly beat that and set the mark over 22 metres for the first time, with 22.02 metres in his first throw. Udo Beyer beat the old record at 21.40 metres in the second set of throws, but this put him only in third place so far in the competition. Timmermann improved on his own new record with a 22.16 metres throw in the third set and then a 22.29 metres throw in the fifth. Randy Barnes took the record briefly in the sixth and final throws, hitting 22.39 metres before Timmermann—in the last throw by anyone in the competition—recaptured the record and won gold with 22.47 metres.

Schedule

All times are Korea Standard Time adjusted for daylight savings (UTC+10)

Results

Qualifying round

Final

See also
 1984 Men's Olympic Shot Put (Los Angeles)
 1986 Men's European Championships Shot Put (Stuttgart)
 1987 Men's World Championships Shot Put (Rome)
 1990 Men's European Championships Shot Put (Split)
 1991 Men's World Championships Shot Put (Tokyo)
 1992 Men's Olympic Shot Put (Barcelona)

References

External links
  Official Report
  todor66

S
Shot put at the Olympics
Men's events at the 1988 Summer Olympics